Peter Hugh Nolan CBE (born April 1949) is  the Chong Hua Chair in Chinese Development and is Director of the University’s  Centre of Development Studies, University of Cambridge and a Fellow of Jesus College, Cambridge. He previously held the Sinyi Professor of Chinese Management,  at the  Cambridge Judge Business School also at the University of Cambridge. Nolan is a member of the Advisory Board of Cambridge Journal of Eurasian Studies.

Nolan was named in the 2009 New Year Honours and made a Commander of the Order of the British Empire for his work in developing British and Chinese business relations.

Peter Nolan received his BA degree from the University of Cambridge, and his MSc and PhD from the School of Oriental and African Studies at the University of London. He was also awarded an honorary doctorate by Copenhagen Business School.

In June 2021, Peter Nolan was subject to controversy when he cautioned students against holding debates on Uyghur genocide, in the light of him and Jesus College, Cambridge being allegedly funded by People's Republic of China. This is one of the many incidents reported in the media where the Chinese Communist Party may be interfering with academic freedom in universities around the world.

References

External links

 
 
 https://archive.today/20120720212706/http://uk.cbs.dk/research/departments_centres/institutter/arc/hoejreboks/nyheder/peter_nolan_appointed_honorary_doctor_at_cbs
 http://www.timeshighereducation.co.uk/story.asp?storycode=404903
 https://web.archive.org/web/20100414165012/http://www.soas.ac.uk/events/event56425.html

1949 births
Living people
People educated at St Boniface's Catholic College
Alumni of SOAS University of London
Fellows of Jesus College, Cambridge
Academics of the University of Cambridge
Commanders of the Order of the British Empire